William Leonard Moore (born October 31, 1943) is an author and former UFO researcher, prominent from the late 1970s to the late 1980s. He co-authored two books with Charles Berlitz, including The Roswell Incident.

Career
Interested in UFOs since he was a teenager, Moore attended Thiel College, located in Greenville, Pennsylvania graduating in 1965. He taught language and humanities at various high schools. He became Arizona state section director of the Mutual UFO Network and left teaching to pursue a career as a freelance writer.

Moore wrote The Philadelphia Experiment - Project Invisibility with Charles Berlitz in 1979, about an alleged naval military experiment popularly known as the Philadelphia Experiment aboard the USS Eldridge in 1943.

In 1980, Moore wrote The Roswell Incident  with writing partner Charles Berlitz, which alleged the Roswell UFO incident had involved the crash of an extraterrestrial space ship.

In May 1987, Moore along with ufologists Jaime Shandera and Stanton Friedman circulated the Majestic 12 documents that purported the existence of a high-level policy making group overseeing UFOs and extraterrestrials.

At a 1989 MUFON conference, Moore claimed that he had been engaged in "disinformation" activities against Paul Bennewitz on behalf of the Air Force Office of Special Investigations.

Critical reception 
According to author Barna William Donovan, The Philadelphia Experiment - Project Invisibility was "largely dismissed even by the most committed conspiracy and supernatural buffs as nothing more than a shoddy, uncritical repeat of a lingering and completely unsubstantiated urban myth." Donovan wrote that critics have deemed The Roswell Incident "a collection of wild hearsay" offering "second - and third-hand accounts Berlitz and Moore then use for fantastic speculation and to jump to a lot of unwarranted conclusions", and that when critics and skeptics characterized the Majestic 12 documents as fraudulent, "The accusing fingers were pointing at Moore."

Books
 The Philadelphia Experiment  Project Invisibility (1979)
 The Roswell Incident (1980)

See also
 UFO conspiracy theory

References

American male non-fiction writers
American UFO writers
American conspiracy theorists
UFO conspiracy theorists
JFK-UFO conspiracy theories
Ufologists
Roswell incident
1943 births
Living people